Sunkrish Bala (born Sunkrish Balasubramanian  May 21, 1984) is an American actor.

Early life
Bala was born in Mumbai, Maharashtra, India, and is of Tamil ancestry. He graduated from Bellarmine College Preparatory in 2002 and from the school of Theater, Film, & Television at UCLA in 2006.

Career
From 2007–2008, Bala was a series regular on the ABC comedy Notes from the Underbelly portraying the role of Eric. Bala was also a series regular on the MTV series I Just Want My Pants Back in the role of Bobby. The show was cancelled after one season.  Bala had recurring roles as Dr. Caleb Subramanian on The Walking Dead and Vikram Singh on Castle.

Filmography

References

External links

Reel at ReelAccess.com
Life of a Bala, Nirali Magazine, December 2006
Profile at ABCmedianet.com
AArisings A-Profiler Interview Published December 8, 2007

1984 births
Living people
Indian emigrants to the United States
American male television actors
American Hindus
American people of Indian Tamil descent
Male actors from Mumbai
UCLA Film School alumni
American male actors of Indian descent